Deh Now-e Esahaqabad (also Romanized as Deh Now-e Esaḥāqābād; also known as Deh-e Now and Deh Now) is a village in Posht Rud Rural District, in the Central District of Narmashir County, Kerman Province, Iran. At the 2006 census, its population was 186, in 50 families.

References 

Populated places in Narmashir County